The Center for Economic Research and Graduate Education – Economics Institute, known as CERGE-EI is an academic institution in Prague, Czech Republic, specialised in economics. The institute is a partnership between the Center for Economic Research and Graduate Education of Charles University and the Economics Institute of the Czech Academy of Sciences. It is also a New York State Education Department entity with a permanent charter for its degree-granting educational programs awarded by the New York State Board of Regents. It is located in the Schebek Palace in the center of Prague.

The center was founded in 1991 by a group that included Jan Švejnar and Jozef Zieleniec, with a goal to educate a new generation of economists from post-communist countries. The school provides an American-style PhD program in economics, a US-chartered Master of Arts program in Applied Economics (the MAE program), and the UPCES study abroad program. CERGE-EI also conducts research in theoretical and policy-related economics.

Students

There are approximately 120 students from over 30 countries, primarily from Central and Eastern Europe and the post-Soviet states. There are 20 permanent faculty members, most of whom have studied PhDs in economics from U.S. and Western European universities.

Academic programs

The MA/PhD program
The PhD program is modelled on US graduate economics courses. Courses include Microeconomics, Macroeconomics, Econometrics in the first year, and a choice of elective subjects in the second year. A Master of Arts (MA) degree is awarded to students who complete the two years of coursework. CERGE-EI students frequently conduct part of their dissertation research at partner universities in Western Europe and North America. The dissertation usually consists of three scientific papers.

CERGE-EI is accredited by the Czech Ministry of Education, Youth and Sports and has a permanent charter from the Board of Regents of the New York State Education Department. The New York State Board granted CERGE-EI's permanent charter to award PhD and MA degrees in economics in 2005, following a temporary charter awarded in 2001.

Partner universities
CERGE-EI has study exchange partnerships with several universities in the United States and Western Europe, including:

 Bocconi University
 Boston University
 California Institute of Technology
 Columbia University
 Harvard University
 Institute of Advanced Studies (Vienna)
 National Bureau of Economic Research
 New York University
 Princeton University
 Stanford University
 Tilburg University
 Tinbergen Institute
 Universite Libre de Bruxelles
 University College London
 University of California at Berkeley
 University of Cambridge
 University of Essex
 University of Michigan
 University of Paris 1 Pantheon-Sorbonne
 University of Pittsburgh
 University of Toronto
 University of Pennsylvania
 West Virginia University

As part of the FINNOV research collaboration program, CERGE-EI works with University of Cambridge, The Open University, Sant'Anna School of Advanced Studies in Italy, Polytechnic University of Marche, Italy, University of Bordeaux in France, and University of Sussex in UK. CERGE-EI also has an academic partnership with Organizational Dynamics at the University of Pennsylvania.

Financial aid
Many students admitted to the MA/PhD program are granted tuition waivers for the first two years of study.  Almost all students who continue in the PhD program after the first two years are granted tuition waivers.

With the exception of first-year, first-semester students, students receiving a stipend are typically required to fulfill an assistantship (such as a research assistantship or teaching assistantship) each month as part of their study program. Fifth-year students receive funding in the form of a salary through employment as Junior Economic Institute Researchers (JEIRs). Selected third- and fourth-year students are eligible for this form of support as well.

The MAE program
The MAE program is a one-year, three-semester Master of Arts program in Applied Economics, conducted in English. The academic degree program is run under the charter granted by the Board of Regents of the New York State Education Department (University of the State of New York), and is therefore an American degree.

UPCES Study Abroad in Prague Program
In 2001, CERGE-EI and Charles University established the Undergraduate Program in Central European Studies (UPCES), a study abroad program in Prague for North American undergraduate students. The program's headquarters are in the CERGE-EI Schebek Palace.

Visiting Master's Scheme
The Visiting Master's Scheme is run jointly by CERGE-EI and the Institute of Economics Studies (IES) at the Faculty of Social Sciences, Charles University in Prague. It combines the Master-level courses at the IES with the MA/PhD courses at CERGE-EI.

Research
CERGE-EI was ranked #58 of 1,236 institutions worldwide by the Social Science Research Network (SSRN), in its ranking of the Top Economics Departments and Research Centers. Research Papers in Economics (RePEc) ranked CERGE-EI in the top 6 percent of economics departments/research institutions in Europe.

The permanent and visiting faculty of CERGE-EI is currently composed of members from the Czech Republic, Slovakia, Russia, Italy, Greece, Turkey, Croatia and the United States. CERGE-EI visiting faculty are part-time lecturers and dissertation committee members who regularly visit CERGE-EI. CERGE-EI was granted permission by Václav Havel to seek support for an endowed chair in political economy in his name.

CERGE-EI also supports advanced economic research; in the 1990s, CERGE-EI conducted thorough research on the economics of transition. As the post-communist countries developed into market economies, the research interests of CERGE-EI faculty and students have expanded to other areas of economics, such as dynamic macroeconomic theory, experimental economics, labor and public economics.

CERGE-EI publishes an in-house working paper series, organizes regular research seminars at which academics from universities around the world present their current papers, hosts professional conferences, and houses the largest economics library in Central and Eastern Europe.

GDN
CERGE-EI is the Central and East European Regional Network representative for the Global Development Network (GDN), a spin-off of the World Bank.

IDEA think tank
CERGE-EI has established the Institute for Democracy and Economic Analysis (IDEA), a public policy think-tank staffed by CERGE-EI academics and graduates, and researchers from other institutions.

Funding
CERGE-EI is financed by educational and research grants from the Czech government, and from other Czech and foreign entities, as well as private donations from individuals, foundations, and corporations. Fundraising activities are carried out by two affiliated institutions, CERGE-EI Foundation U.S.A. and Nadace CERGE-EI. Some funding also comes from student tuition payments.

Governance
CERGE-EI is governed by an Executive and Supervisory Committee (ESC), which makes major strategic and financial decisions, supervises local management, and makes decisions on the hiring and promotion of faculty members. The ESC is composed of internationally recognized scholars in the field of economics, representatives of Charles University and the Academy of Sciences, and tenured faculty members of CERGE-EI.

Members of the Executive and Supervisory Committee

Jan Švejnar, (Chair), Columbia University, and CERGE-EI
Philippe Aghion, University College London and Department of Economics, Harvard University
Wendy Carlin, University College London
Henry Farber, Princeton University
Randall K. Filer, Hunter College and the Graduate Center, City University of New York
Byeongju Jeong, CERGE-EI
Štěpán Jurajda, CERGE-EI
George J. Mailath, University of Pennsylvania
Kevin M. Murphy, University of Chicago
J. Peter Neary, University of Oxford
Lucrezia Reichlin, London Business School
Gérard Roland, University of California, Berkeley
Larry Samuelson, Yale University
Avner Shaked, Department of Economics, University of Bonn
Christopher A. Sims, Princeton University, Nobel Prize in Economics 2011
Jakub Steiner, CERGE-EI and Northwestern University
Joseph Stiglitz, Columbia University, New York City, Nobel Prize in Economics 2001
Zdeněk Strakoš, Academy of Sciences of the Czech Republic and Charles University
Jan Ámos Víšek, Charles University
Josef Zieleniec, former Member of the European Parliament (MEP)
Krešimir Žigić, CERGE-EI

Sports

Since 2009 students have organized an annual squash tournament. In the spring, CERGE-EI students and faculty take part in the annual Prague Charity Softball tournament.

References

External links
CERGE-EI website

Economics schools
Universities in the Czech Republic
1991 establishments in Czechoslovakia
Educational institutions established in 1991